Ahmad Göde or Gövde Ahmad , born Sultanzade Ahmed and commonly known as Ahmad Beg or Sultan Ahmad, was a ruler of the Aq Qoyunlu. 

Ahmad was a grandson of Uzun Hasan and Mehmed the Conqueror through his father and mother side respectively. He was also a son-in-law (damat) to Bayezid II.

Name 
According to Turkish sources, he got the nickname göde due to his short height.

According to the Safavid historian Hasan Beg Rumlu:

Early life 
In 1474, before Ahmad's birth, his father Ughurlu Muhammad rebelled against Ahmad's grandfather, the then ruling sultan Uzun Hasan, and took refuge in the Ottoman Empire. Mehmed the Conqueror welcomed Ughurlu and married him to his daughter Gevherhan Hatun. Ahmad was born from this marriage, but hardly knew his father since Ughurlu Muhammad was killed in 1477. He was raised in the Ottoman court where he received the care and attention befitting a claimant to the Aq Qoyunlu throne and a nephew of Bayezid. Indeed, Bayezid felt a strong familial bond with the young prince as he frequently addressed him as his dear son in official correspondence and offered his daughter Aynışah Sultan in marriage for him.

The arrival of the embassy of military commanders and urban notables sent from Diyarbakir by Nur Ali assured Ahmad a broad coalition of support would welcome his return.

Ahmad left Constantinople shortly and met Nur Ali and an army of supporters at Erzincan before Rustam's defeat in the summer 1497.

Reign 
In 1497 he overthrew his cousin Rustam Beg, after returning from exile in Ottoman territory. A month or two later, Rustam attempted to regain his throne with the help of the Qajars in the Ganja region, which costed his life. Meanwhile, he made serious reforms, and even had some great begs executed. Meanwhile Ayba Sultan in Kerman, made an agreement with the governor of Fars, Purnek Qasim Beg and declared Sultan Ya'qub's son Murad Beg the ruler. However, shortly afterwards, Murad was imprisoned in Rûyindiz castle and Ayba Sultan recognized the rule of Alwand Beg.

On 14 December 1497, Ahmad was defeated and killed near Isfahan. After his death, the Aq Qoyunlu empire underwent further disintegration. None of the tribal factions could secure more than provincial recognition of its favored throne-claimant, with the result that three sultans reigned concurrently.

Personal life 
A copy Shahnama (located in Topkapı Palace) dated 1495-1496 AD "was completed for him at Herat". This luxuriously produced illustrated manuscript, with a lacquer painted binding, carries an inscription saying that it was produced for the library of Sultan Ahmad. The fact that its illustrations are in the Aq Qoyunlu style, encourages the thought that Ahmad Beg may have been the "Ahmad Padishah".

Family
Göde Ahmad married his cousin Aynışah Sultan, a daughter of Sultan Bayezid II (brother of his mother Gevherhan Hatun).

Together, they had a son and two daughters:
Neslihan Hanımsultan; married to his cousin Şehzade Alaeddin Ali, son of Şehzade Ahmed, himself one of Aynışah's half-siblings. She had a daughter, Hvandi Sultan.
Hanzade Hanımsultan; married in 1508 her cousin Sultanzade Yahyapaşaoğlu Bali Bey, son of Şahzade Sultan (daughter of Bayezid II). The union was a failure, as the couple lived in separation and the princess, per a report of her behaviour to Sultan Selim in 1516, engaged in a string of scandalous acts. Caught committing adultery with a man at Skopje, who was killed along with six members of her household, she then relocated against permission to Istanbul where she took a young Quran reciter, known as Dellakoğlu Bak, as a lover, bearing him a daughter who died aged approximately six months old. Upon his death of malaria at Babaeski, en route from Edirne to Istanbul, she found a new companion in his brother. The letter's author, most likely Selim's son and her own cousin, the future Suleiman the Magnificent, then based at Edirne, credited her acts to the help of her ″boundless and unparalleled″ wealth and several named procuring servants.
Sultanzade Zeyneddin Bey (May/June 1497 - 1508); reportedly born the same day that news of Göde Ahmed's takeover of the Ağ Qoyunlu throne was received.

Quotes

References

Sources  
 
 
 
 
  Retrieved on 18 April 2020.
 
 
 

1476 births
1497 deaths
Aq Qoyunlu rulers
Damats
Leaders who took power by coup